Nicky Night Time  (real name Nick Routledge) is an Australian pop musician. 

Nicky Night Time's single "Everybody Together" reached number 1 on the ARIA Club Chart and at the ARIA Music Awards of 2014, was nominated for ARIA Award for Best Dance Release.

Nicky was a member of the electropop band Van She, where he sometimes went by the name Nicky Van She.

He is also a member of duo Naations with Nat Dunn.

Discography

Singles

Awards

AIR Awards
The Australian Independent Record Awards (commonly known informally as AIR Awards) is an annual awards night to recognise, promote and celebrate the success of Australia's Independent Music sector.

|-
| AIR Awards of 2015
| "Gonna Get Better" (with Nat Dunn)
| Best Independent Dance/Electronic Club Song or EP
| 
|-

ARIA Music Awards
The ARIA Music Awards is an annual awards ceremony that recognises excellence, innovation, and achievement across all genres of Australian music. 

|-
| 2014
| "Everybody Together" 
| Best Dance Release
| 
|-

References

Living people
Year of birth missing (living people)